Xonville is a commune in the Meurthe-et-Moselle department in north-eastern France.

Population

See also
Communes of the Meurthe-et-Moselle department
Parc naturel régional de Lorraine

References

Communes of Meurthe-et-Moselle